Naum Yakovlevich Vilenkin (October 30, 1920 in Moscow – October 19, 1991 in Moscow) was a Soviet mathematician, an expert in representation theory, the theory of special functions, functional analysis, and combinatorics. He is best known as the author of many books in recreational mathematics aimed at middle and high school students.

Biography 
Vilenkin studied at the Moscow State University where he was a student of A.G. Kurosh. He received his habilitation in 1950; and was awarded the Ushinsky prize for his school mathematics textbooks in 1976.

Books 
 Combinatorics by N.Ia. Vilenkin, A. Shenitzer, and S. Shenitzer (hardcover – Sep 1971)
 Representation Theory and Noncommutative Harmonic Analysis II: Homogeneous Spaces, Representations, and Special Functions (Encyclopaedia of Mathematical Sciences) by A. U. Klimyk, V. F. Molchanov, N. Ya. Vilenkin, and A. A. Kirillov (hardcover – Aug 26, 2004)
 Representation of Lie Groups and Special Functions: Recent Advances (Mathematics and Its Applications) by N. Ja, Vilenkin and A. U. Klimyk (hardcover – Nov 1, 1994)
 Representation of Lie Groups and Special Functions Volume 1: Simplest Lie Groups, Special Functions and Integral Transforms (Mathematics and its Applications) by N.Ia. Vilenkin and A. U. Klimyk (hardcover – Nov 15, 1991)
 Generalized Functions. Volume 5. Integral geometry and representation theory by I. M. Gel'fand, M. I. Graev, N. Ya. Vilenkin, and E. Saletan (hardcover – Oct 25, 1966)
 Direct decompositions of topological groups, I, II (American Mathematical Society. Translation) by N. Ia. Vilenkin (1950)

Books in recreational mathematics 
 In Search of Infinity by N. Ya. Vilenkin (Hardcover – 1995)
 Combinatorial mathematics for recreation by N. Ia. Vilenkin (1972)
 Stories About Sets by N. Ia. Vilenkin (Paperback – 1968)
 Successive approximation, (Popular lectures in mathematics) by N. Ya. Vilenkin (1964)

References 
 F. I. Karpelevich, A. U. Klimyk, L. M. Koganov, et al. "Naum Yakovlevich Vilenkin (on the occasion of his seventieth birthday)", Russian Math. Surveys 46 (1991), 251–254.

1920 births
1991 deaths

Soviet mathematicians
Combinatorialists
Mathematicians from Moscow